Zyle Motors (formerly, Daewoo Motor Sales) is an auto sales company headquartered in Seoul, South Korea. It was established in 1991. Daewoo Motor Sales operates dealerships in South Korea which sell buses from Zyle Daewoo Commercial Vehicle (formerly, "Daewoo Bus"). It is the largest motor sales company in Korea.

History 
Daewoo Motor Sales was a partner in MMSK Corporation, a joint venture involved in the import and distribution of vehicles from Mitsubishi Motors. 85% of the venture was owned by Daewoo Motor Sales, with the remaining 15% owned by Mitsubishi Corp and Mitsubishi Corp (Korea) Ltd. Retail sales in South Korea of Mitsubishi cars imported from Japan and the U.S. commenced in the second half of 2008.  MMSK Corporation stopped importing U.S.-sourced Eclipse coupes a few years later.

Daewoo Motor Sales also operates Seoul Auto Auction, South Korea's largest auto auction. It also operates a network of pre-owned car dealerships.

In 1996, Daewoo Development established the brand name "Iaan". The actress Kim Hee-sun is featured in Korean Iaan commercials.

In 2008, Daewoo Motor Sales was chosen to fund the joint venture company for Paramount Movie Park Korea which was scheduled to open in 2011, while Paramount will act as its licensor and manage creative development.

In 2010, Daewoo Motor Sales was dropped by General Motors. The long-time dealership partner then signed a deal with the SsangYong Motor Company to supply new vehicles to sell (specifically the Rodius, Chairman W and Chairman H), in return for the injection of 20 billion won ($17.6 million) into the car maker still recovering from bankruptcy. The deal is non-exclusive, meaning SsangYong will also sell vehicles through private dealers.

That same year, and following a last-minute consultation, creditors including Korea Development Bank decided to help Daewoo Motor Sales settle 17.66 billion won ($15.98 million) worth of notes held by Daewoo Bus Corp. and Daewoo Commercial Vehicle Co., as reported by the creditor banks.

Daewoo Motor Sales has been under the debt rescheduling program since April 14 due to deteriorating financial problems.

References

External links
 

Daewoo
Retail companies established in 1991
Automotive services companies of South Korea
Vehicle retailers
Auto dealerships
South Korean companies established in 1991